Zenophleps obscurata is a species of geometrid moth in the family Geometridae. It is endemic to North America.

The MONA or Hodges number for Zenophleps obscurata is 7409.

References

Further reading

External links

 

Xanthorhoini